The 2001 Jacksonville State Gamecocks football team represented Jacksonville State University as a member of the Southland Football League during the 2001 NCAA Division I-AA football season.  The Gamecocks compiled an overall record of 5–6 with a mark of 2–4 in conference play, placing fifth in the Southland. Jacksonville State played home games at Paul Snow Stadium in Jacksonville, Alabama.

Schedule

References

Jacksonville State
Jacksonville State Gamecocks football seasons
Jacksonville State Gamecocks football